The Nebraska Midland Railroad was a narrow gauge steam line that was established in 1973 in North Platte, Nebraska.  It operated only one year of passenger service there before having to look for a new base due to not being able to obtain the needed right of way.  It then relocated to Stuhr Museum in Grand Island, Nebraska and operated at least through the 1980s.  It used a  narrow gauge  Baldwin steam engine that had originally run on the White Pass and Yukon Route. In 2001 Locomotive #69 was sold back to WP&Y & in 2008 it was restored to run again.

References

Rail transportation in Nebraska
3 ft gauge railways in the United States